KIDL may refer to:
the former ICAO code for what is now John F. Kennedy International Airport (when it was known as "Idlewild Airport")
the current ICAO code for Indianola Municipal Airport